The 2011 WNBA season is the 15th season for the San Antonio Silver Stars franchise of the Women's National Basketball Association. It was their 9th in San Antonio.

Transactions

WNBA Draft
The following are the Silver Stars' selections in the 2011 WNBA Draft.

Transaction log
February 2: The Silver Stars signed Shanavia Dowdell and Ashley Walker.
March 7: The Silver Stars signed Tully Bevilaqua.
March 17: The Silver Stars signed Kelly Mazzante.
April 20: The Silver Stars traded Michelle Snow to the Chicago Sky in exchange for Jia Perkins.
May 2: The Silver Stars traded second- and third-round picks in the 2012 Draft to the Tulsa Shock in exchange for Scholanda Robinson.
May 16: The Silver Stars signed Alysha Clark.
May 31: The Silver Stars waived Shanavia Dowdell.
June 2: The Silver Stars waived Alysha Clark, Kelly Mazzante, and AShley Walker.

Trades

Personnel changes

Additions

Subtractions

Roster

Depth

Season standings

Schedule

Preseason

|- align="center" bgcolor="bbffbb"
| 1 || May 25 || 7:00pm || @ Connecticut || 80–56 || Young (14) || Riley (7) || Hammon (6) || Mohegan Sun Arena  4,801 || 1–0
|- align="center" bgcolor="ffbbbb"
| 2 || May 27 || 7:00pm || @ Connecticut || 73–75 || Perkins (13) || Phillips (10) || Robinson (6) || Mohegan Sun Arena at Casey Plaza  2,139 || 1–1
|-

Regular season

|- align="center" bgcolor="bbffbb"
| 1 || June 4 || 8:00pm || Tulsa || COX || 93–73 || Young (20) || HodgesRileyYoung (4) || HammonHodgesD. Robinson (5) || AT&T Center  12,406 || 1–0
|- align="center" bgcolor="bbffbb"
| 2 || June 10 || 8:00pm || @ Tulsa ||  || 93–62 || Hodges (19) || Phillips (8) || Hammon (5) || BOK Center  7,509 || 2–0
|- align="center" bgcolor="bbffbb"
| 3 || June 11 || 8:00pm || Atlanta ||  || 86–74 || Adams (32) || Adams (7) || Hammon (8) || AT&T Center  9,140 || 3–0
|- align="center" bgcolor="bbffbb"
| 4 || June 17 || 10:00pm || @ Phoenix || FS-A || 101–99 || Young (26) || Young (8) || Hammon (9) || US Airways Center  12,274 || 4–0 
|- align="center" bgcolor="ffbbbb"
| 5 || June 21 || 8:00pm || Phoenix || ESPN2 || 98–105 || Hammon (28) || Appel (11) || HammonD. Robinson (7) || AT&T Center  7,072 || 4–1 
|- align="center" bgcolor="bbffbb"
| 6 || June 24 || 8:00pm || Los Angeles ||  || 90–80 (OT) || Perkins (31) || Riley (9) || Hammon (9) || AT&T Center  8,617 || 5–1 
|- align="center" bgcolor="bbffbb"
| 7 || June 26 || 3:00pm || @ Atlanta || NBATVSSO || 92–86 || Perkins (25) || Perkins (8) || Hammon (6) || Philips Arena  5,718 || 6–1
|- align="center" bgcolor="bbffbb"
| 8 || June 28 || 8:00pm || @ Chicago || CN100 || 84–74 || Young (19) || Young (9) || Hammon (5) || Allstate Arena  3,894 || 7–1 
|-

|- align="center" bgcolor="ffbbbb"
| 9 || July 1 || 7:00pm || @ New York || NBATV || 75–81 || Adams (19) || Young (8) || Hammon (5) || Prudential Center  6,714 || 7–2 
|- align="center" bgcolor="ffbbbb"
| 10 || July 8 || 8:00pm || New York || NBATV || 73–76 || Hammon (18) || Young (8) || Young (6) || AT&T Center  8,100 || 7–3 
|- align="center" bgcolor="ffbbbb"
| 11 || July 12 || 8:00pm || Los Angeles || NBATVFS-SWPRIME || 74–84 || Young (22) || Young (11) || Hammon (7) || AT&T Center  6,769 || 7–4 
|- align="center" bgcolor="bbffbb"
| 12 || July 14 || 9:00pm || Seattle || ESPN2 || 69–66 || Adams (23) || AdamsYoung (6) || Hammon (9) || AT&T Center  9,167 || 8–4 
|- align="center" bgcolor="bbffbb"
| 13 || July 18 || 10:30pm || @ Los Angeles ||  || 79–69 || Hammon (26) || Young (10) || D. Robinson (6) || Staples Center  8,818 || 9–4 
|- align="center" bgcolor="ffbbbb"
| 14 || July 21 || 10:00pm || @ Seattle || NBATVFS-SW || 55–73 || Young (12) || Appel (6) || BevilaquaHammon (2) || KeyArena  6,922 || 9–5 
|-
| colspan="11" align="center" valign="middle" | All-Star break
|- align="center" bgcolor="bbffbb"
| 15 || July 26 || 7:00pm || @ Washington || CSN-MA || 73–67 || Hammon (22) || Appel (12) || D. Robinson (3) || Verizon Center  11,331 || 10–5
|- align="center" bgcolor="bbffbb"
| 16 || July 28 || 12:30pm || Phoenix || NBATVFS-SWFS-A || 102–91 || Hammon (33) || Appel (8) || D. Robinson (8) || AT&T Center  14,797 || 11–5 
|- align="center" bgcolor="ffbbbb"
| 17 || July 31 || 3:00pm || Minnesota || NBATV || 69–70 || Perkins (18) || Appel (8) || Hammon (6) || AT&T Center  7,260 || 11–6 
|-

|- align="center" bgcolor="ffbbbb"
| 18 || August 2 || 10:00pm || @ Seattle ||  || 64–78 || S. Robinson (12) || Young (5) || BevilauqaHammon (4) || KeyArena  6,179 || 11–7 
|- align="center" bgcolor="ffbbbb"
| 19 || August 4 || 8:00pm || @ Minnesota || NBATVFS-SW || 60–62 || Young (18) || Young (13) || Hammon (4) || Target Center  8,123 || 11–8 
|- align="center" bgcolor="bbffbb"
| 20 || August 6 || 8:00pm || Tulsa ||  || 72–64 || Young (20) || Appel (6) || Hammon (5) || AT&T Center  8,273 || 12–8 
|- align="center" bgcolor="ffbbbb"
| 21 || August 9 || 7:00pm || @ Indiana ||  || 68–81 || Hammon (19) || Young (9) || Hammon (5) || Conseco Fieldhouse  7,520 || 12–9 
|- align="center" bgcolor="bbffbb"
| 22 || August 11 || 7:30pm || @ Connecticut || FS-SW || 72–59 || Hammon (18) || Young (8) || Hammon (5) || Mohegan Sun Arena  5,334 || 13–9 
|- align="center" bgcolor="ffbbbb"
| 23 || August 14 || 3:00pm || Chicago || NBATVCN100 || 73–85 || Perkins (18) || Young (6) || D. Robinson (7) || AT&T Center  7,060 || 13–10 
|- align="center" bgcolor="ffbbbb"
| 24 || August 16 || 8:00pm || Indiana ||  || 63–65 || PerkinsD. RobinsonS. Robinson (10) || Young (13) || Bevilaqua (4) || AT&T Center  6,358 || 13–11 
|- align="center" bgcolor="ffbbbb"
| 25 || August 20 || 10:00pm || @ Phoenix || NBATVFS-SWFS-A || 81–87 || Hammon (22) || HammonYoung (8) || Hammon (10) || US Airways Center  10,134 || 13–12 
|- align="center" bgcolor="ffbbbb"
| 26 || August 23 || 10:00pm || @ Seattle ||  || 55–63 || Young (14) || Young (8) || Hammon (5) || KeyArena  6,559 || 13–13 
|- align="center" bgcolor="ffbbbb"
| 27 || August 26 || 8:00pm || @ Minnesota || NBATV || 75–85 || Adams (11) || Young (6) || Hammon (9) || Target Center  9,212 || 13–14 
|- align="center" bgcolor="ffbbbb"
| 28 || August 28 || 3:00pm || Minnesota ||  || 61–72 || Hodges (12) || Hammon (7) || Hammon (7) || AT&T Center  7,924 || 13–15 
|- align="center" bgcolor="bbffbb"
| 29 || August 30 || 8:00pm || Connecticut ||  || 78–66 || Hammon (16) || Perkins (8) || Hammon (6) || AT&T Center  6,934 || 14–15 
|-

|- align="center" bgcolor="bbffbb"
| 30 || September 1 || 8:00pm || Phoenix ||  || 86–68 || Perkins (23) || Young (9) || D. Robinson (7) || AT&T Center  6,502 || 15–15 
|- align="center" bgcolor="ffbbbb"
| 31 || September 3 || 8:00pm || Seattle || NBATV || 60–70 || Young (22) || RileyYoung (5) || D. Robinson (6) || AT&T Center  9,575 || 15–16 
|- align="center" bgcolor="bbffbb"
| 32 || September 6 || 10:30pm || @ Los Angeles || NBATVFS-SWPRIME || 82–65 || Hammon (37) || Appel (8) || Hammon (5) || Staples Center  8,502 || 16–16 
|- align="center" bgcolor="bbffbb"
| 33 || September 10 || 8:00pm || Washington || NBATV || 82–74 || Young (17) || AppelYoung (8) || Hammon (11) || AT&T Center  12,813 || 17–16 
|- align="center" bgcolor="bbffbb"
| 34 || September 11 || 7:00pm || @ Tulsa || NBATVFS-SW || 102–94 (OT) || D. Robinson (36) || Adams (8) || D. Robinson (6) || BOK Center  5,949 || 18–16 
|-

| All games are viewable on WNBA LiveAccess or ESPN3.com

Postseason

|- align="center" bgcolor="ffbbbb"
| 1 || September 16 || 9:00pm || @ Minnesota || NBATV || 65–66 || AdamsHammon (16) || Young (9) || Young (6) || Target Center  11,891 || 0–1 
|- align="center" bgcolor="bbffbb"
| 2 || September 18 || 5:00pm || Minnesota || ESPN2 || 84–75 || Perkins (24) || AdamsPerkins (6) || Hammon (6) || AT&T Center  7,023 || 1–1 
|- align="center" bgcolor="ffbbbb"
| 3 || September 20 || 8:00pm || @ Minnesota || ESPN2 || 67–85 || Young (17) || Riley (6) || Hammon (5) || Target Center  8,734 || 1–2
|-

Statistics

Regular season

Postseason

Awards and honors
Becky Hammon was named WNBA Western Conference Player of the Week for the week of July 25, 2011.
Danielle Adams was named Rookie of the Month for the month of June.
Danielle Adams was named to the 2011 WNBA All-Star Team as a reserve.
Becky Hammon was named to the 2011 WNBA All-Star Team as a reserve.
Danielle Adams was named to the All-Rookie Team.
Danielle Robinson was named to the All-Rookie Team.

References

External links

San Antonio Stars seasons
San Antonio